Magomed Ramazanovich Kurbanov (born 3 August 1995) is a Russian professional boxer who fights as a light middleweight. As an amateur he won a gold medal at the 2008 Youth World Championships.

Biography
Magomed Kurbanov was born on 3 August 1995, in the village of Pervomayskoye, Kayakentsky District, Dagestan, Russia, into a simple family.

When he was 12, he and his mother moved to Khanty-Mansiysk, a town in western Siberia. His uncle took him to a boxing gym. His first trainer was Alexander Sleptsov. Then he went to Yugra Boarding College of Olympic Reserve.

Today he lives in the city of Yekaterinburg.

Career
As an amateur, Kurbanov won titles at the national level, as well as the 2008 Youth World Championship. Kurbanov turned pro in 2015 under Russian promotional outfit RCC Boxing. He made his professional debut on June 19, 2015, winning by technical knockout against Cameroonian boxer Charlan Takam.

After winning his first six pro bouts, Kurbanov defeated Manuk Dilanyan by TKO in May 2016 for his first regional belt. Kurbanov won three more bouts during 2016, winning more regional and minor belts from various sanctioning bodies, and scoring at least one knockdown in each fight.

Kurbanov reached an agreement to fight former three-division world champion Shane Mosley in May 2017, but a month before the fight Mosley pulled out due to injury. Kurbanov instead faced Virgilijus Stapulionis, whom he defeated by TKO in the 9th round. The Mosley fight was rescheduled for September but Mosley would pull out once again due to the same back injury.

In September 2017, Kurbanov defeated number 5 WBO contender Štěpán Horváth by unanimous decision (116-112, 115-112, 115-113). Kurbanov was knocked down for the first time during this fight. He acquired a vacant WBO International light middleweight title.

In December 2017, he defended his title against Akinori Watanabe, in Yekaterinburg city, and won by a technical knockout in the eighth round.

Professional boxing record

References

External links
 Magomed Kurbanov on VK
 
 

1995 births
Living people
Russian male boxers
Light-middleweight boxers
People from Dagestan
People from Khanty-Mansiysk
Sportspeople from Yekaterinburg